Sandin 2-y (2-se Sanyın) is a rural locality (a village) in Yermolayevsky Selsoviet, Kuyurgazinsky District, Bashkortostan, Russia. The population was 149 as of 2010. There are 3 streets.

Geography 
Sandin 2-y is located 14 km southwest of Yermolayevo (the district's administrative centre) by road. Sandin and Mayachny are the nearest rural localities.

References 

Rural localities in Kuyurgazinsky District